Beowulf is a 1999 American science fantasy-action film loosely based on the Old English epic poem Beowulf. The film was directed by Graham Baker and written by Mark Leahy and David Chappe. Unlike most film adaptations of the poem, this version is a science-fiction/fantasy film that, according to one film critic, "takes place in a post-apocalyptic, techno-feudal future that owes more to Mad Max than Beowulf." While the film remains fairly true to the story of the original poem, other plot elements deviate from the original poem (Hrothgar has an affair with Grendel's mother, and they have a child together, Grendel; Hrothgar's wife commits suicide).

Plot 
A castle-like outpost comes under attack by a creature, named Grendel, on a nightly basis. However, it refuses to attack the border lord Hrothgar. One of the outpost's residents, Pendra, escapes the following morning but is captured by a rival siege line who intend to kill her to prevent the outpost's evil from spreading. Pendra is saved by a mysterious warrior named Beowulf and rides with him. When she realizes Beowulf is riding for the outpost, she runs back to the siege line and is killed. Beowulf meets Hrothgar and is permitted to stay to help slay the beast. Hrothgar, his daughter Kyra, and his military leader Roland suspect that Beowulf was sent by a rival family to avenge the death of their son Nivri, Kyra's former husband. However, Kyra's suspicions dissipate when she realizes that Beowulf can sense evil.

For a few nights, Hrothgar experiences nightmares, triggered by a succubus, about his late wife's suicide. When Grendel attacks during the day, Beowulf and Hrothgar's remaining soldiers are forced to confront Grendel. They evacuate the women and children to a sanctuary, but they are immediately slaughtered by Grendel. Beowulf manages to wound Grendel, but is also wounded in the process. As Kyra attends to Beowulf, Roland confesses his romantic feelings for her; however, she only sees him as a brother. After Beowulf recovers, Kyra reveals that Nivri was an abusive spouse and she killed him after he attempted to force himself on her. Beowulf believes she was justified. Beowulf faces Grendel again and severs its arm. Believing Grendel to be dead, the survivors celebrate and Roland is visited by the succubus.

Kyra discloses her romantic feelings to Beowulf and the two engage in intercourse. Afterwards, Beowulf reveals to Kyra that he is half-human because his mother was impregnated by Bael and he is able to suppress his inner evil by battling evil. Beowulf senses the succubus and rushes to find her. Kyra and Hrothgar return to the dining hall to find everyone dead, including Roland. They encounter the succubus, who reveals herself to be Grendel's mother and Hrothgar as its father, hence why Grendel had spared him before. Hrothgar's unfaithfulness led to his wife's suicide. Hrothgar attempts to kill the succubus but is killed by Grendel. Beowulf arrives and kills the beast. Grendel's mother attempts to appeal to Beowulf's inner evil, but fails and transforms into a giant humanoid spider-like creature. After Beowulf defeats her, their battle forces the outpost to collapse on itself. Beowulf and Kyra escape, and she convinces him to let her accompany him on his journeys.

Cast 
 Christopher Lambert as Beowulf
 Rhona Mitra as Kyra
 Oliver Cotton as Hrothgar
 Götz Otto as Roland
 Vincent Hammond as Grendel
 Charlie Robinson as Weaponsmaster
 Brent Jefferson Lowe as Will
 Roger Sloman as Karl
 Layla Roberts as Grendel's mother
 Patricia Velásquez as Pendral

Production
The production was filmed in Romania. The film's end credits says: "Filmed on location in Romania". The specific location is the city of Rupea, in Transylvania.

Themes
As with other Beowulf adaptations, the film reinterprets the poem, blending its original genre with "tropes from horror and soft pornography," but it also retains and expands on its original elements.

The film addresses the poem's plot point of Beowulf not having a wife or an heir, as it reveals Beowulf to be the same kind of creature the monsters themselves, making him refraining from wanting to produce offspring. The poem's emphasis on genealogy is represented by humans and monsters mating among them, with Grendel being the son of Hrothgar and Beowulf being the result of a god of darkness inseminating a woman. Beowulf and Grendel are shown as mirror images of each other, as the former harbors an internal struggle to contain his monstrous nature, while the latter was conceived by her mother as a revenge of an external oppression.

Grendel's mother is portrayed as a representation of monstrous female sexuality. She operates as a seductive succubus, giving birth to monsters, but can also shapeshift into a monster herself. This form resembles a dragon, an arachnid and a gorgon, not only evoking the Freudian Medusa's Head, but also evoking the archaic mother by resembling a vagina dentata with phallic talons. She also sexually attacks Hrothgar, inverting the trope of horror film monsters chasing after female leads.

Music

The film's soundtrack mainly featured electronic and industrial songs from various artists and original score material by Juno Reactor's Ben Watkins.
 Jonathan Sloate – "Beowulf"
 Front 242 – "Religion (Bass Under Siege mix by the Prodigy)"
 Pig – "No One Gets Out of Her Alive, Jump the Gun (Instrumental)"
 Gravity Kills – "Guilty (Juno Reactor remix)"
 Juno Reactor – "God is God"
 Fear Factory – "Cyberdyne"
 Laughing US – "Universe"
 KMFDM – "Witness"
 Lunatic Calm – "The Sound"
 Junkie XL – "Def Beat"
 Urban Voodoo – "Ego Box"
 2wo – "Stutter Kiss"
 Spirit Feel – "Unfolding Towards the Light"
 Mindfeel – "Cranium Heads Out"
 Frontside – "Dammerung"
 Praga Khan – "Luv u Still"
 Anthrax – "Giving the Horns"
 Monster Magnet – "Lord 13"

Critical response
Critical reaction to the film has been highly negative. The general criticisms for the film were the weak script, below-average acting, corny dialogue, deviations from the source material, and over-reliance on camp, although it was hailed for its production design. Danél Griffin of Film as Art said the film "understands that liberties must be taken with the poem's characters to create a more cinematic experience, and there are moments that, even in its liberties, it reveals a deep appreciation for the poem, and a profound understanding of its ideas. There are other moments, however, that seem so absurd and outlandish that we wonder if the writers, Mark Leahy and David Chappe, have even read the poem." Griffin added that "Lambert is certainly effective", but concluded that "clever ideas aside, the film is unfortunately mediocre at best. The set design and some of the revised storyline are both stupendous, but the overall experience makes for poor cinema."

Beyond Hollywood's review said that "genre films don't get any sillier than this", but called the film "above average". The review praised the film's "energetic action" and said that it "excels in set design", but added that "the techno (music) is pretty annoying." Calling the film "a cheesy post-apocalyptic update of the ancient tale", Carlo Cavagna of About Film praised the film's action scenes but felt that Lambert and Mitra had no chemistry.

Literature scholars have been negative as well. Michael Livingstone and John William Sutton are brief, calling it an "an otherwise ridiculous" film, though they say it well reflects the problematization of "black-and-white morality" "in our postmodern, post Vietnam, post-9/11 era." Commenting on the movie's proposed similarity between Beowulf and Grendel, they say, "although the film is cringingly hokey and melodramatic, it effectively illustrates the idea of the aeglaeca—that Beowulf and the monsters may have more in common than we care to admit."

References

External links 
 
 
 

1999 films
1999 fantasy films
American fantasy action films
American science fiction action films
1990s English-language films
Films based on Beowulf
Films based on European myths and legends
Films based on Norse mythology
Films shot in Romania
Films directed by Graham Baker
Films produced by Lawrence Kasanoff
Films about shapeshifting
American post-apocalyptic films
American science fantasy films
Dimension Films films
1990s science fiction action films
The Kushner-Locke Company films
Succubi in film
American monster movies
1990s American films